"The Last One to Know" is a song written by Matraca Berg and Jane Mariash, and recorded by American country music artist Reba McEntire.  It was released in September 1987 as the first single and title track from the album The Last One to Know.  The song was McEntire's ninth number one country hit as a solo artist.  The single went to number one for one week and spent a total of fourteen weeks on the country chart. It was previously recorded by Karen Brooks for her 1985 album, I Will Dance with You.

Charts

References
 

1987 singles
1987 songs
Reba McEntire songs
Songs written by Matraca Berg
Song recordings produced by Jimmy Bowen
MCA Records singles